Natalya Sutyagina (born 17 January 1980 in Penza) is a butterfly swimmer from Russia, who won the gold medal in the 50 m butterfly at the 2004 European Aquatics Championships. She is trained by Vladimir Timofeev. Sutyagina competed at three consecutive Summer Olympics, starting in 2000.

References

1980 births
Living people
Russian female swimmers
Russian female butterfly swimmers
Olympic swimmers of Russia
Swimmers at the 2000 Summer Olympics
Swimmers at the 2004 Summer Olympics
Swimmers at the 2008 Summer Olympics
European Aquatics Championships medalists in swimming
Universiade medalists in swimming
Universiade silver medalists for Russia
Medalists at the 2001 Summer Universiade